is a Japanese group rhythmic gymnast. Born in Beppu, she represents her nation at international competitions.

She participated at the 2008 and 2012 Summer Olympics in London. She also competed at world championships, including at the 2007, 2009, 2010 and 2011 World Rhythmic Gymnastics Championships.

References

External links
Kotono Tanaka at Sports Reference
https://database.fig-gymnastics.com/public/gymnasts/biography/6397/true?backUrl=%2Fpublic%2Fresults%2Fdisplay%2F1862%3FidAgeCategory%3D8%26idCategory%3D78%23anchor_2369
http://www.bbc.com/sport/olympics/2012/athletes/44b281a6-1cd6-48a3-86c1-395166636236
http://www.gettyimages.com/pictures/kotono-tanaka-9166860#japan-perform-with-the-ball-during-the-group-allaround-rhythmic-on-picture-id150204597

1991 births
Living people
Japanese rhythmic gymnasts
Gymnasts at the 2012 Summer Olympics
Olympic gymnasts of Japan
Gymnasts at the 2008 Summer Olympics
Sportspeople from Ōita Prefecture

People from Ōita Prefecture
21st-century Japanese women